Lake Kariba is the world's largest artificial lake and reservoir by volume. Lake Kariba was filled between 1958 and 1963 following the completion of the Kariba Dam at its northeastern end, flooding the Kariba Gorge on the Zambezi River.
 
The Zimbabwean town of Kariba was built for construction workers on the lake's dam, while some other settlements such as Binga village and Mlibizi in Zimbabwe and Siavonga and Sinazongwe in Zambia have grown up to house people displaced by the rising waters.

Physical characteristics
It is the world's largest man-made reservoir by volume, four times as large as the Three Gorges Dam. The enormous mass of water (approximately 180,000,000,000,000 kilograms, or 180 petagrams [180 billion tons]) is believed to have caused induced seismicity in the seismically active region, including over 20 earthquakes of greater than 5 magnitude on the Richter scale.

The lake has several islands, including Maaze Island, Mashape Island, Chete Island, Sekula, Sampa Karuma, Fothergill, Spurwing, Snake Island, Antelope Island, Bed Island, and Chikanka.

Ecology

During the filling-up phase of the lake, the water was high in nutrients coming from decomposing, inundated vegetation, creating a thick layer of fertile soil on land that became the lake bed. As a result, the ecology of Lake Kariba is vibrant. A number of fish species have been introduced to the lake, notably the sardine-like kapenta (transported from Lake Tanganyika), which now supports a thriving commercial fishery. Other inhabitants of Lake Kariba include Nile crocodiles and hippopotami.

Gamefish, particularly tigerfish, which was among the indigenous species of the Zambezi river system, now thrive on the kapenta, which in turn encourages tourism. Both Zambia and Zimbabwe are now attempting to develop the tourism industry along their respective coasts of Lake Kariba.

Fish eagles, cormorants and other water birds patrol the shorelines, as do large numbers of elephants and other big game species including lion, cheetah, leopard, buffalo and a myriad of smaller plains game species. The southern Matusadona National Park was once a haven for black and white rhinoceros, but recent poaching activity has dramatically reduced their numbers.

Protected areas
The portion of Lake Kariba which falls within Zimbabwe has been designated a Recreational Park within the Zimbabwe Parks and Wildlife Estate.

See also
Nyaminyami
Kariba Town
Kariba Ferries
Lake Volta, the largest reservoir by surface area in the world.

References

External links
 "Lake Kariba". Zambiatourism.com. Retrieved August 11, 2005.
 "Dam Statistics: Africa and the Middle East Regions". World Commission on Dams. Retrieved August 11, 2005.
 "Lake Profile: Kariba". LakeNet. Retrieved August 11, 2005.
 World Lakes Database entry for Lake Kariba

 
Kariba
Kariba
Zambezi River
Kariba
Geography of Mashonaland West Province
Geography of Southern Province, Zambia
Zambia–Zimbabwe border